Khuushuur is a meat pastry or dumpling popular in Mongolia that is relatively similar to similar items in Russian and other cuisines like chiburekki. The meat, beef, mutton, or camel, is ground up and mixed with onion (or garlic), salt and other spices. The cook rolls the dough into circles, then places the meat inside the dough and folds the dough in half, creating a flat half-circular pocket. The cook then closes the pockets by pressing the edges together. A variety of khuushuur has a round shape produced by pressing the dough and mince together using the dough roller.

After making the pockets, the cook fries them in oil until the dough turns a golden brown. The khuushuur is then served hot, and can be eaten by hand.

This type of Mongolian cuisine is similar to buuz in that the meat is prepared in the same way and cooked in a dough pocket, the principal difference being that buuz is steamed instead of fried.

See also 
 Buuz

External links 

 Recipe
 Recipe
 Recipe

Dumplings
Savoury pies
Deep fried foods
Mongolian cuisine